Terminal Virus is a 1995 American film produced by Roger Corman and starring James Brolin. It is part of the Roger Corman Presents series.

Plot
Twenty-three years after a big war has left a sexually transmitted virus that makes reproduction impossible, an outlaw and the son of a pioneering scientist who developed a possible cure before he was murdered try to convince a suspicious population to give the serum a chance.

References

External links
Review of film at EW

Terminal Virus at Letterbox DVD

1996 films
Films produced by Roger Corman
American horror television films
1990s science fiction horror films
1990s English-language films
1990s American films